The 1988 Maldives coup d'état attempt was by a group of Maldivians led by businessman Abdullah Luthufi and assisted by armed mercenaries of a Tamil secessionist organisation from Sri Lanka, the People's Liberation Organisation of Tamil Eelam (PLOTE), to overthrow the government in the island republic of Maldives. 

Whereas the 1980 and 1983 coup d'état attempts against Maumoon Abdul Gayoom's presidency were not considered serious, the third coup d'état attempt in November 1988 alarmed the international community. About 80 armed PLOTE mercenaries landed in the capital Malé before dawn aboard speedboats from a hijacked Sri Lankan freighter. Disguised as visitors, a similar number had already infiltrated Malé earlier. The mercenaries quickly gained control of the capital, including the major government buildings, airport, port, television and radio stations. The mercenaries then marched towards the Presidential Palace where President Gayoom was residing with his family. But before they reached the Presidential Palace, President Gayoom was escorted by Maldivian National Security Advisor to the Defense Minister's home. The Defense Minister then escorted the President to a safe house. Meanwhile, the mercenaries had seized the Presidential Palace and managed to take the Maldivian Education Minister as hostage. President Gayoom requested military intervention from Sri Lanka and Pakistan, but both denied any help, citing a lack of military capabilities. The president then requested Singapore's intervention, but Singapore declined, citing the same reasons. After that, he contacted the United States, but was told that it would take US forces 2–3 days to reach the Maldives from their nearest military base in Diego Garcia, 1000 km away. The president then contacted the United Kingdom, which advised them to seek assistance from India. Following this, President Gayoom contacted the Indian government for assistance. India swiftly accepted their request and an emergency meeting was arranged at the Secretariat Building in New Delhi. Within 16 hours of the SOS, India was ready to commence their operation.

Operation Cactus

Rejaul Karim Laskar, a member of the then-ruling political party in India- Indian National Congress, stated that India's intervention in the attempted coup became necessary as in the absence of Indian intervention, external powers would have been tempted to intervene or even to establish bases in Maldives, which being in India's backyard would have been detrimental to India's national interest. India, therefore, intervened with "Operation Cactus".

The operation started on the night of 3 November 1988, when Ilyushin Il-76 aircraft of the Indian Air Force airlifted the elements of the 50th Independent Parachute Brigade, commanded by Brigadier Farukh Bulsara, the 6th Battalion of the Parachute Regiment and the 17th Parachute Field Regiment from Agra Air Force Station and flew them non-stop over 2,000 kilometres (1,240 mi) to land them over the Malé International Airport on Hulhule Island. The Indian Army paratroopers arrived on Hulhule in nine hours after the appeal from President Gayoom.

The Indian paratroopers immediately secured the airfield, crossed over to Malé using commandeered boats and rescued President Gayoom. The paratroopers restored control of the capital to President Gayoom's government within hours. Some of the mercenaries fled toward Sri Lanka in a hijacked freighter. Those unable to reach the ship in time were quickly rounded up and handed over to the Maldives government. Nineteen people reportedly died in the fighting, most of them mercenaries. The dead included two hostages killed by the mercenaries. The Indian Navy frigates Godavari and Betwa intercepted the freighter off the Sri Lankan coast, and captured the mercenaries. The swift intervention by the Indian military and accurate intelligence successfully quelled the attempted coup d'état in the island nation.

Reaction
India received international praise for the operation. United States President Ronald Reagan expressed his appreciation for India's action, calling it "a valuable contribution to regional stability". British Prime Minister Margaret Thatcher reportedly commented, "Thank God for India: President Gayoom's government has been saved". But the intervention nevertheless caused some disquiet among India's neighbours in South Asia.

Aftermath
In July 1989, India repatriated the mercenaries captured on board the hijacked freighter to Maldives to stand trial. President Gayoom commuted the death sentences passed against them to life imprisonment under Indian pressure.

The 1988 coup d'état had been headed by a once prominent Maldivian businessperson named Abdullah Luthufi, who was operating a farm on Sri Lanka. Former Maldivian President Ibrahim Nasir was accused, but denied any involvement in the coup d'état. In fact, in July 1990, President Gayoom officially pardoned Nasir in absentia in recognition of his role in obtaining Maldives' independence.

The operation also strengthened Indo-Maldivian relations as a result of the successful restoration of the Gayoom government.

Published accounts

Documentaries
Operation Cactus : How India Averted Maldives Crisis in 1988 (2018) is a TV documentary which premièred on Veer by Discovery Channel series, Battle Ops.

See also 
 Parachute Regiment (India)
 Mohamed Zahir
 Moosa Ali Jaleel
 Indian Peace Keeping Force
 Liberation Tigers of Tamil Eelam

References

Conflicts in 1988
Maldives coup d'état, 1988
Maldives coup d'état, 1988
Maldives
Maldives Coup, 1988
Coup d'état attempts in Asia
Wars involving the Maldives
India–Maldives relations
Maldives coup d'état, 1988
Maldives coup d'état, 1988
November 1988 events in Asia